Emanuel Davie Jones (born April 1, 1959) is an American politician and businessman, who has served in the Georgia State Senate from the 10th district since 2005. He attended the University of Pennsylvania where he received a bachelor's degree in Electrical Engineering and Columbia University where he received an MBA in Finance/Accounting.  He was commissioned a Second Lieutenant in the U.S. Army Corps of Engineers in 1980 and rose to the rank of captain.

Honors and awards

: Order of the Knights of Rizal, Knight Commander of Rizal (KCR) - (October 25, 2019).

References

External links

 Profile at the Georgia State Senate
 Campaign website

1959 births
Living people
21st-century American politicians
African-American state legislators in Georgia (U.S. state)
Democratic Party Georgia (U.S. state) state senators
21st-century African-American politicians
20th-century African-American people